Jordan Johnson may refer to:

 Jordan Johnson (fighter) (born 1988), mixed martial arts
 Jordan Johnson (footballer) (born 1986), British Virgin Islands footballer
 Jordan Johnson (EastEnders), soap opera character